Leucopogon costatus, commonly known as twiggy beard-heath, is a species of flowering plant in the heath family Ericaceae and is endemic to southern continental Australia. It is an erect or straggling shrub with broadly egg-shaped, stem-clasping leaves, and white, tube-shaped flowers, the petals densely bearded on the inside.

Description

Taxonomy
Twiggy beard-heath was first formally described in 1885 by Ferdinand von Mueller who gave it the name Styphelia costata in Southern Science Record from specimens collected by Otto Tepper on Kangaroo Island. In 1918, John McConnell Black changed the name to Leucopogon costatus in the Transactions and Proceedings of the Royal Society of South Australia. The specific epithet (costatus) means "ribbed".

Distribution and habitat
Leucopogon costatus grows mallee, scrub and heathland in the Little Desert National Park and southern Big Desert regions of Victoria and in the south-east of South Australia, including Kangaroo Island.

References

costatus
Ericales of Australia
Flora of Victoria (Australia)
Flora of South Australia
Plants described in 1885
Taxa named by Ferdinand von Mueller